The Turinelli & Pezza was an Italian electric car manufactured only in 1899.  Manufactured in Milan, it featured front wheel drive.

References
David Burgess Wise, The New Illustrated Encyclopedia of Automobiles.

Defunct motor vehicle manufacturers of Italy
Electric vehicles introduced in the 20th century
Milan motor companies